The Second Federal Electoral District of Aguascalientes (II Distrito Electoral Federal de Aguascalientes) is one of the 300 Electoral Districts into which Mexico is divided for the purpose of elections to the federal Chamber of Deputies and one of three such districts in the state of Aguascalientes.

It elects one deputy to the lower house of Congress for each three-year legislative period, by means of the first past the post system.

District territory
Under the 2005 redistricting process, it is made up of the eastern portion of the municipality of Aguascalientes.

The district's head town (cabecera distrital), where results from individual polling stations are gathered together and collated, is the state capital, the city of  Aguascalientes, Ags.

Previous districting schemes

1996–2005 district
Between 1996 and 2005, the district was composed of northern portion of the municipality of Aguascalientes.

Deputies returned to Congress from this district 

XLVII Legislature
1967–1970: José Refugio Esparza Reyes (PRI)
XLVIII Legislature
1970–1973: Baudelio Lariz Lariz (PRI)
XLIX Legislature
1973–1976: Higinio Chávez Marmolejo (PRI)
L Legislature
1976–1977: Augusto Gómez Villanueva (PRI)
1977–1979: Camilo López Gómez (PRI)
LI Legislature
1979–1982: Gilberto Romo Nájera (PRI)
LII Legislature
1982–1985: Héctor Hugo Olivares Ventura (PRI)
LIII Legislature
1985–1986: Miguel Ángel Barberena Vega (PRI)
1986-1988: Alberto Alcalá de Lira (PRI)
LIV Legislature
1988–1991: Augusto Gómez Villanueva (PRI)
LV Legislature
1991–1994: Javier Rangel Hernández (PRI)
LVI Legislature
1994–1997: Héctor Hugo Olivares Ventura (PRI)
LVII Legislature
1997–2000: Benjamín Gallegos Soto (PAN)
LVIII Legislature
2000–2003: Fernando Herrera Ávila (PAN)
LIX Legislature
2003–2006: Francisco Javier Valdés (PAN)
LX Legislature
2006–2009: Ernesto Ruiz Velasco (PAN)
LXI Legislature
2009–2012: David Hernández Vallín (PRI)
LXII Legislature
2012–2015: María Teresa Jiménez Esquivel (PAN)
LXIII Legislature
2015–2018: Arlette Ivette Muñoz Cervantes (PAN)
LXIV Legislature
2018–2021: Elba Lorena Torres Díaz (PES)

References 

Federal electoral districts of Mexico
Aguascalientes